Diogo de Oliveira Barbosa (born 4 December 1996), sometimes known as just Diogo, is a Brazilian professional footballer who plays as a forward for Liga MX club UNAM, on loan from Plaza Colonia.

References

1996 births
Living people
Brazilian footballers
Uruguayan Primera División players
Liga MX players
Club Plaza Colonia de Deportes players
Club Universidad Nacional footballers
Footballers from São Paulo